This is a list of Canadian films which were released in 2009:

See also
 2009 in Canada
 2009 in Canadian television

External links
Feature Films Released In 2009 With Country of Origin Canada at IMDb
Canada's Top Ten for 2009 (lists of top ten Canadian features and shorts, selected in a process administered by TIFF)
 List of 2009 box office number-one films in Canada

2009
2009 in Canadian cinema
Canada